Paranephelium is a genus of Asian small trees in family Sapindaceae, subfamily Sapindoideae.

Species 
Plants of the World Online and the Catalogue of Life list the following:

 Paranephelium hainanensis, H.S. Lo
 Paranephelium hystrix W.W.Sm.
 Paranephelium joannis M. Davids
 Paranephelium macrophyllum King
 Paranephelium spirei Lecomte
 Paranephelium xestophyllum Miq.

References

External links 
 
 

 
Flora of Indo-China
Taxonomy articles created by Polbot
Sapindaceae genera